Les Francofolies are an annual music festival founded in 1985 in La Rochelle, Poitou-Charentes, France as an initiative of Jean-Louis Foulquier. It is usually held annually in July and aims at promoting French-language music. 

Number of those attending the festival has exceeded 160,000 in 2007. Founder Jean-Louis Foulquier went on to establish Les FrancoFolies de Montréal in 1989.

Jean-Louis Foulquier founder of the festival died December 10, 2013 following a long illness.

See also 
Les FrancoFolies de Montréal
Les Francofolies de Spa

External links
 Official site of Francofolies de la Rochelle

Organisation internationale de la Francophonie
Recurring events established in 1985
1985 establishments in France